The architecture of Georgia refers to the styles of architecture found in Georgia. The country is exceptionally rich in architectural monuments. Characteristic features of the Georgian architecture are monumentality, clear composition, strict proportions, moderate use of decorations, and above all these the harmonic interaction with nature.

Georgian architecture is influenced by a number of architectural styles, including several each for castles, towers, fortifications, palaces and churches. The Upper Svaneti fortifications and the castle town of Shatili in Khevsureti are among the finest examples of medieval Georgian castles.

Georgian medieval churches have a distinct character, though related to Armenian and Byzantine architecture, typically combining a conical dome raised high on a drum over a rectangular or cross-shaped lower structure. Often known as the "Georgian cross-dome style," this style of architecture developed in Georgia during the 9th century. Before that, most Georgian churches were basilicas. One distinguishing feature of Georgian ecclesiastical architecture, one which can be traced back to a high emphasis on individualism in Georgian culture, is reflected in the allocation of space inside the churches. Other examples of Georgian ecclesiastic architecture can be found overseas, in Bulgaria (Bachkovo Monastery built in 1083 by Georgian military commander Grigorii Bakuriani), in Greece (Iviron monastery built by Georgians in the 10th century) and in Jerusalem (Monastery of the Cross built by Georgians in the 9th century).

Other architectural styles in Georgia include the Hausmannized Rustaveli Avenue in Tbilisi and that city's Old Town District.

History 
The history of construction in Georgia can be traced back to the 5th-4th millennia BC, from Paleolithic to the Late Medieval times. The oldest structures were made of stone and wood, and later of bricks.

7th century

This was the period of considerable rethinking of church internal space. It was increased by introduction of pillars that held now the tholobate, which gave possibility to experiment with the walls and improved esthetic perception of the interior. Traditional triangular niches by the sides of the apse also appear in this century. First such example, which actually started new traditions, was Tsromi church.

10th century

The first hints of the emerging 11-13th century architecture appear in this period in Kumurdo Cathedral.

11th century
From the beginning of the century Georgian architecture becomes exceptionally artistic and decorative. Facades acquire rich relief ornamentation and arcading. Predominant ornamental motifs are inspired from nature – flowers, birds, wild and domestic mammals and people. Characteristic for eastern façade axial two rombs with ornamented window and cross above, first appeared in Samtavisi, was later used up until the 13th century. Many earlier built churches, like Svetitskhoveli and Manglisi cathedrals, were substantially rebuilt and decorated in the 11th century.

Major step in the general design was introduction of the cross-in-square plan.

Examples of that period: Samtavisi Cathedral, Samtavro church.

12th century
Following the traditions established in the 11th century, the accent was put on increased illumination of interiors in order to better observe frescos. This reflected in creating more windows in dome and side walls.

Examples: Ikorta church.

13th century
Bell towers near the churches start to be constructed from the middle of the century.

Invasion of Khwarezmians and Mongols, and strong earthquake of 1283 brought significant destructions. Meanwhile, the end of the 13th century is notable for large scale construction of monasteries; particularly in provinces less effected by invasions, like Samtskhe. Its rulers of the Jakeli family succeeded in building one of the best in that period and still largely preserved St. Saba's Church, part of Sapara Monastery. Following generally the Golden Age traditions, churches of that period are characterised by more simplified and less expressive decorations. Facade architecture disappears, and decorations are made on smooth surfaces. Previously convex window decorations become immersed into the wall. Cladding is characteristically polychromatic. The dome looks heavier than in previous centuries, and its tholobate typically has twelve windows, although starting from St. Saba's Church, the number increases to sixteen - eight true and eight false windows.

14th century
The decline, which began in the previous century due to Mongol dominance, continued to reflect in the architecture of the 14th century. The church dome tholobate becomes more stumpy. The facade decorations remaining only around the doors and windows. The examples include Gergeti Trinity Church, Zarzma and Chulevi monastery.

See also

 Darbazi

References

Further reading 

 The Georgians, David Marshal Lang, 6th chapter: Architecture & Art